Krostitz is a municipality in the district of Nordsachsen, in Saxony, Germany.

It is best known for its brewery which brews Ur-Krostitzer beer.

King Gustavus Adolphus of Sweden stayed here in 1631 before the Battle of Breitenfeld (1631).

References 

Nordsachsen